Asa and Caroline Wing House is a historic home located at Mexico in Oswego County, New York.  It was probably built in the 1830s and is a -story frame settlement period structure.  It has a fieldstone foundation, post and beam construction, plank walls, and gable roof.  Asa and Caroline Wing purchased the home in 1847.  It is a well-documented location used in harboring fugitive slaves.  Specifically, from December 24–27, 1850, Asa Wing harbored seven members of the Thompson family in their flight to Canada.

It was listed on the National Register of Historic Places in 2001.

Caroline M. Mitchell Wing (1821–1889) married Asa Wing in 1843; he died in 1853.

References

Houses on the National Register of Historic Places in New York (state)
Houses in Oswego County, New York
National Register of Historic Places in Oswego County, New York
Underground Railroad locations